Berlin is the third studio album by German rock band Kadavar, released on 21 August 2015 by Nuclear Blast. It was the first album to fully feature new bassist Simon Bouteloup. 
It featured a cover of Nico's "Reich der Träume" as a bonus track.

Background
After working for four months in the studio, the band finalized the production process of the new album on 1 June 2015, according to their Facebook page.

Drummer and producer Christoph "Tiger" Bartelt commented:
"About 10 years ago, when we - independently of one another - moved to Berlin, we just wanted to break free from home and do something new. I thought it was comfortable, to blend in and just live from day to day. A lot of very long nights and so many completely different people at one place. Where there are opposites you can always ground yourself. We’re all different, come from different places but have managed to create something together we all like. I think the Berlin lifestyle has influenced our band very much and therefore fits perfectly as the album’s title."

The 11th and final track on the album, "Into the Night," was chosen by pro skateboarder Riley Hawk for his Scion AV compilation album Riley Hawk: Northwest Blow Out EP.

Track listing

Bonus Track

Personnel
Kadavar
Christoph Lindemann – vocals, electric guitar
Simon Bouteloup – bass
Christoph Bartelt - drums, percussion, production, engineering, mixing

Additional personnel

Elizaveta Porodina - photography, modeling
Pelle Gunnerfeldt - mixing
Robin Schmidt - mastering

Charts

References

External links
 
 

2015 albums
Kadavar albums